The Kitzur Shulchan Aruch (קיצור שולחן ערוך), first published in 1864, is a work of halacha written by Rabbi Shlomo Ganzfried. The work was written in simple Hebrew which made it easy for the lay person to understand and contributed to its great popularity.

Contents 
The work is a summary of the sixteenth-century Shulchan Aruch of Rabbi Joseph Caro, with references to later rabbinical commentaries. It focuses on the Orach Chaim and Yoreh Deah sections of the Shulchan Aruch, and includes laws of daily life, Shabbat, holidays, and so on. It is divided into 221 chapters (called simanim). 

This work was explicitly written as a popular text and as such is not at the level of detail of the Shulchan Aruch itself, while generally following the Shulchan Aruch's structure. Rabbi Ganzfried expressed his intentions in his introduction:

Ganzfried based his decisions on the opinions of three Ashkenazi rabbinic authorities: Rabbis Yaakov Lorberbaum (author of Nesivos HaMishpat), Schneur Zalman of Liadi (author of Shulchan Aruch HaRav), and Abraham Danzig (author of Chayei Adam and Chochmat Adam). In cases of disagreement between them, Ganzfried adopted the majority view. Caro had already used a similar method to write the Shulchan Aruch in 1563; his rabbinic authorities of reference were Isaac Alfasi, Maimonides, and Asher ben Yechiel.

Ganzfried was a Hungarian Jew, and put the emphasis of his work on the customs of the Hungarian Jews of his time. The work is also known for its strict rulings.

Reception 

The Kitzur became immensely popular after its publication for its simplicity, and is still a popular book in Orthodox Rabbinic Judaism where it is commonly studied. Many other works – Ben Ish Hai, Chayei Adam and others – are also concise, and suitable for laypersons as summaries of the Shulchan Aruch, but did not reach the level of the Kitzur's popularity. 

The Kitzur is not used as a basis for making decisions of a legal nature; instead, rabbis use the full Shulchan Aruch and later works by the achronim and poskim.

Due to its popularity, this book is often printed with cross references of other halacha works, especially the Shulchan Aruch HaRav or the Mishna Berura; a popular edition contains notes by Rabbi Mordechai Eliyahu, entitled Darkeh Halacha, with cross-references of the Sephardic rabbinical authorities.

Many editions of the Kitzur include an appendix with the laws pertaining to the Land of Israel, which were compiled by the Chazon Ish. There is a commentary by Rabbi Shlomo Zalman Braun on this work, entitled Shearim Metzuyanim be-Halakhah, which examines contemporary problems in the light of the work. Ganzfried, however, stated that comments were not needed for this work, since it tried to summarize the Halacha as far as possible, and that these comments should be included in the original Shulchan Aruch, and not in the Kitzur.

The Kitzur Shulchan Aruch Yomi ("Daily Kitzur Shulchan Aruch") is a daily learning program where the study of this work is completed in one year. The schedule does not follow the contents in order; rather it is arranged such that one reviews the laws of the Jewish holidays in the weeks before each. A person can start learning at any time of the year and complete it over the course of the year. The program is increasingly popular as it requires only 5 – 10 minutes per day.

Translations 
The Kitzur Shulchan Aruch has been translated into English several times. Hyman E. Goldin's translation was published in 1961 with an attempt to eliminate errors and improve upon previous translations, making it "more comprehensible to scholar and layperson alike." Goldin's translation bore the English title "Code of Jewish Law".

The 1980s and 90s saw the publication of two modernized translations, which included cross references similar to those in contemporary Hebrew editions as above: in 1987 Metsudah Publications released a translation by Rabbi Avrohom Davis, and in 1991 Moznaim Publishing released a translation by Rabbi Eliyahu Touger. The Artscroll translation of 2011, under the general editorship of Rabbi Eliyahu Klugman, includes comparisons with the Mishnah Berurah and the Igrot Moshe of Moshe Feinstein. Various other translations are available online.
 Code of Jewish Law. Hebrew Publishing Co. (Transl. Hyman Goldin), 1927. 
 Kitzur Shulchan Aruch. Compact Set. Metsudah Publications, 2006. 
 Kitzur Schulchan Oruch. Moznaim Publishing Corp, 1991. 
 The Kleinman Edition Kitzur Shulchan Aruch. Vol. 1. Artscroll, 2008. 
It has been translated also into Spanish in two volumes by Rabbi Nosson Grunblatt and published by Kehot Lubavitch Sudamericana, Buenos Aires, Argentina.

Electronic versions
 Full Hebrew text: PDF, Word, Android app
 Full Hebrew and English text online at Sefaria and Chabad.org
 Kitzur Shulchan Aruch Yomi daily calendar

See also

Similar works
 Chayei Adam and Chochmat Adam by Avraham Danzig (Poland, 1748–1820), similar Ashkenazi works.
 Ben Ish Chai by Yosef Chaim (Baghdad, 1832–1909), a Sephardi work with a similar purpose.
 Kitzur Shulchan Aruch, a similar Sephardi work by Rabbi Raphael Baruch Toledano.
 Kitzur Shulchan Aruch Mekor Hayyim, a similar Sephardi work by Rabbi Hayim David HaLevi.
 The volumes entitled Kitzur Shulchan Aruch from Yalkut Yosef, a similar Sephardi work.
 Kitzur Shulchan Aruch Sefardi by Rabbi Reuven Amar.
 Dat Vadin, a summary of the Shulchan Aruch and Mishne Torah translated to Russian.

Other study cycles

Academic articles

References 

1864 non-fiction books
Rabbinic literature
Hebrew-language religious books
Hebrew words and phrases in Jewish law
Sifrei Kodesh
Rabbinic_legal_texts_and_responsa